Provincial elections were held in the Netherlands on the 15th of March 2023, on the same day as the water board elections, as well as island council elections in the Caribbean Netherlands. These elections also indirectly determine the composition of the Senate, since the members of the twelve provincial states, alongside electoral colleges elected on the same day, will elect the Senate's 75 members in the Senate election on 30 May, two months after the provincial elections.

Electoral system

Elections for the provincial councils of the twelve provinces of the Netherlands are held every four years in March using the D'Hondt method. Voters also have the option to cast a preferential vote. The seats won by a list are first allocated to the candidates who, in preferential votes, have received at least 25% of the number of votes needed for one seat, regardless of their placement on the electoral list. If multiple candidates from a list pass this threshold, their ordering is determined based on the number of votes received. Any remaining seats are allocated to candidates according to their placement on the electoral list. The size of the provincial councils ranges from 39 members for a province with fewer than 400,000 inhabitants to 55 members for a province with more than 2,000,000 inhabitants. As of 2023 there are a total of 572 seats in the provincial councils.

Schedule

Participating parties 
As of 21 December 2022, 49 parties have been registered with the Electoral Council for participation in general elections, which carries over to provincial elections. Parties can also participate in a province by registering their party name in that province instead of nationally. Which parties participate differs per province, with most large parties represented in the House of Representatives participating in all provinces, with some local and smaller national parties also participating.

Opinion polling

Seats summary

A “-” in the table means that the party in question has not submitted a list of candidates for the 2023 election in that province.

Detailed results

National

By Province

Drenthe

Flevoland

Friesland

Gelderland

Groningen

Limburg

North Brabant

North Holland

Overijssel

South Holland

Utrecht

Zeeland

References 

Provincial
Provincial elections in the Netherlands